Matthias Musche (born 18 July 1992) is a German handball player who plays for SC Magdeburg and the German national team.

He participated at the 2019 World Men's Handball Championship.

References

1992 births
Living people
German male handball players
Sportspeople from Magdeburg
Handball-Bundesliga players
SC Magdeburg players